Glauco was the name of at least two ships of the Italian Navy and may refer to:

 , a  launched in 1905 and discarded in 1916.
 , a  initially ordered by Portugal as Delfim but cancelled before launch and acquired by Italy.  She was launched in 1935 and lost in 1941.

Italian Navy ship names